Meizhou Island (Pu-Xian Min: Mî-ciu-doh), Meichow; Meichou, is a small island close to the coast of China. Meizhou Town is an administrative unit of Xiuyu District, Putian, Fujian, China. It is known for being the birthplace of the goddess Mazu. Meizhou has 38,000 inhabitants, most of whom are involved in the fishing industry. The local language spoken is Pu-Xian Min.

History 

An open provincial tourism economic region since June 1988, in April 1992 Meizhou Island introduced a landing visa policy for visitors from Taiwan. In October of the same year it became a national tourism-vacation region. The island was formally opened to visitors from overseas in October 1999.

Annually, some 100,000 Taiwanese pilgrims come to Meizhou to see the place where Matsu once lived, some of whom visit every year.

Administration
Meizhou Island is administered by Meizhou Town, an area that is divided into 11 villages:
 Gaozhu
 Xiashan "Downhill"
 Lianche "Lotus Pond"
 Beidai (北埭 dài) "North Dam"
 Dongcai "The East Cais"
 Xiting "The Western Pavilion"
 Ganglou "The Tower by the Port"
 Zhaixia "Lower Village"
 Dayang "Great Ocean"

along with three others.

Geography 

Tourist attractions 
The Heavenly Empress Palace-Meizhou Ancestral Temple began as a small shrine soon after Matsu's death in the 10th century. It has now been renovated and greatly enlarged to accommodate pilgrims.

See also

 List of islands of China

References

External links

 Six photos of the Matsu ceremony in Meizhou 
 湄洲岛管委会 

Islands of Fujian
Islands of the South China Sea
Taiwan Strait
Tourist attractions in Putian
Putian
Populated places in Fujian
Islands of China